Maria Socorro Cancio Ramos (born 23 September 1923) is a Filipino entrepreneur. She is the co-founder of National Book Store, the largest bookstore chain in the Philippines.

Biography
Maria Socorro Cancio Ramos was born on 23 September 1923 in Santa Cruz, Laguna. She grew up in an entrepreneurial family. As a child she helped at a young age in her parents' shop and her grandmother's market stall. After graduating from Arellano High School, she worked as a shop girl in the Ramos Goodwill Book Store. Socorro's brother Manuel married one of the daughters of the Ramos family and in 1940 a new bookshop was opened on Escolta Street on the ground floor of Panciteria National. José Ramos was put in charge and asked Socorro to come and work for him. The store was called National Book Store. Shortly afterwards, she married José, despite a ban from her family.

During the Japanese occupation, many of the American books were hidden and the couple mainly sold office supplies, soap and flip flops. During the Battle of Manila in 1945, their store went up in flames and they had to start over with the stash of hidden books. However, three years later, disaster struck again when a typhoon again destroyed the rebuilt store at its new Rizal Avenue location. Once again, the National Book Store was rebuilt with a mezzanine.

Over time, the store expanded. New branches were opened at the intercession of the three children of Socorro and Jose. The company became a real family business and grew into a chain of bookstores with branches throughout the country. In the 1990s, the chain had about 50 branches. Twenty years later, there were 145. The National Book Store became the largest bookstore chain in the Philippines and one of the largest companies in the Philippine retail industry.

Awards and recognition
In 2017, Ramos was one of the recipients of the Outstanding Manilan Award.

References

1923 births
Living people
People from Laguna (province)
20th-century Filipino women
21st-century Filipino women
Filipino women company founders